Serge Leveur (born 17 June 1957) is a retired French pole vaulter.

He won the silver medal at the 1983 Mediterranean Games with a jump of 5.30 metres. The gold went to Patrick Abada, who cleared 5.55 m.

Leveur's personal best jump was 5.60 m, which he achieved twice: in June 1985 in Suresnes, and in July 1986 in Paris.

References

1957 births
Living people
French male pole vaulters
Mediterranean Games silver medalists for France
Mediterranean Games medalists in athletics
Athletes (track and field) at the 1983 Mediterranean Games